Wright County is a county in the U.S. state of Iowa. As of the 2020 census, the population was 12,943. The county seat is Clarion. The county organization became effective in January 1851, and is believed to be named either after Silas Wright, a governor of New York, or Joseph Albert Wright, a governor of Indiana.

Geography
The terrain is generally undulating. The county is intersected by the Boone and Iowa Rivers

Major highways
 Interstate 35
 U.S. Highway 69
 Iowa Highway 3
 Iowa Highway 17

Adjacent counties
Hancock County - north
Cerro Gordo County - northeast
Franklin County - east
Hardin County - southeast
Hamilton County - south
Webster County - southwest
Humboldt County - west
Kossuth County - northwest

Demographics

2020 census
There were 6,260 housing units, of which 5,404 were occupied.

2010 census
There were 6,529 housing units, of which 5,625 were occupied.

2000 census

As of the census of 2000, there were 14,334 people, 5,940 households, and 3,938 families residing in the county. The population density was 25 people per square mile (10/km2). There were 6,559 housing units at an average density of 11 per square mile (4/km2). The racial makeup of the county was 95.93% White, 0.17% Black or African American, 0.18% Native American, 0.20% Asian, 2.90% from other races, and 0.63% from two or more races. 4.93% of the population were Hispanic or Latino of any race.

There were 5,940 households, out of which 28.40% had children under the age of 18 living with them, 57.30% were married couples living together, 6.20% had a female householder with no husband present, and 33.70% were non-families. 30.20% of all households were made up of individuals, and 16.30% had someone living alone who was 65 years of age or older. The average household size was 2.36 and the average family size was 2.92.

In the county, the population was spread out, with 24.50% under the age of 18, 6.50% from 18 to 24, 24.50% from 25 to 44, 23.30% from 45 to 64, and 21.20% who were 65 years of age or older. The median age was 41 years. For every 100 females there were 96.20 males. For every 100 females age 18 and over, there were 92.30 males.

The median income for a household in the county was $36,197, and the median income for a family was $44,043. Males had a median income of $29,398 versus $21,222 for females. The per capita income for the county was $18,247. About 4.20% of families and 7.00% of the population were below the poverty line, including 7.70% of those under age 18 and 6.40% of those age 65 or over.

Education

Primary and secondary
School districts include:
 Belmond-Klemme Community School District
 Cal Community School District
 Clarion-Goldfield-Dows Community School District
 Eagle Grove Community School District
 Humboldt Community School District
 West Fork Community School District
 West Hancock Community School District
 Webster City Community School District

Former school districts:
 Clarion-Goldfield Community School District
 Corwith-Wesley Community School District
 Dows Community School District
 Northeast Hamilton Community School District
 Sheffield Chapin Meservey Thornton Community School District

These three school districts in Wright County have or had high schools in the county:
Clarion-Goldfield-Dows Community School District K-12 Enrollment 954
Eagle Grove Community School District K-12 Enrollment 836
Belmond-Klemme Community School District K-12 Enrollment 793

Tertiary
Iowa State University maintains an extension office in Clarion. Iowa Central Community College in Fort Dodge, North Iowa Area Community College in Mason City, and Ellsworth Community College in Iowa Falls are all within driving distance of Wright County. Iowa Central Community College began offering ICN Polycom classes in Clarion and Eagle Grove in 2015.

Politics
Wright County has, like many counties in Iowa, been a swing state for the majority of its history. The county has voted for the winning candidate in 21 out of the 25 presidential elections in the 20th Century. However, in 2000, the county was won by Republican George W. Bush and has voted for the party in all presidential elections since.

Media
Several small newspapers are published in Wright County, including the Wright County Monitor, serving Clarion and Dows, the Eagle Grove Eagle, and the Belmond Independent.

Wright County Fair
The first Wright County Fair was held in Clarion. The old fairgrounds were located where Clarion's USA Healthcare Center stands today. the Clarion Fair ran until 1924; it was held in Goldfield in 1925, and moved to its present location in Eagle Grove in 1926; it was later retitled as the Wright County District Junior Fair. Entries are open to children in Hamilton, Humboldt, Webster, Hardin, Franklin, and Wright Counties.

Communities

Cities

Belmond
Clarion
Dows
Eagle Grove
Galt
Goldfield
Rowan
Woolstock

Unincorporated communities
Holmes, Iowa

Townships

 Belmond
 Blaine
 Boone
 Dayton
 Eagle Grove
 Grant
 Iowa
 Lake
 Liberty
 Lincoln
 Norway
 Pleasant
 Troy
 Vernon
 Wall Lake
 Woolstock

Population ranking
The population ranking of the following table is based on the 2020 census of Wright County.

† county seat

See also

Wright County Courthouse
Wright County Egg
National Register of Historic Places listings in Wright County, Iowa

References

External links

Wright County website

 
1851 establishments in Iowa
Populated places established in 1851